Detroiters is an American television comedy series created by Sam Richardson, Tim Robinson, Zach Kanin, and Joe Kelly. The series, filmed on location in Detroit, starred native Michiganders Sam Richardson (of Detroit) and Tim Robinson (of Clarkston). The series premiered on Comedy Central on February 7, 2017 and ran for two seasons. On December 11, 2018, Comedy Central canceled the series.

Premise 
Best friends and next-door neighbors Sam Duvet (Richardson) and Tim Cramblin (Robinson) work together as creatives at Tim's family's advertising agency in Detroit (which Tim took over after his father stepped down), producing low-budget TV commercials for local businesses.

Cast
Sam Richardson as Sam Duvet
Tim Robinson as Tim Cramblin

Recurring
Shawntay Dalon as Chrissy Cramblin, Tim's wife and Sam's sister; she works on an automotive assembly line
Pat Vern Harris as Sheila Portnadi, the secretary at Cramblin Advertising
Lailani Ledesma as Lea, an intern at Cramblin Advertising
Andre Belue as Tommy Pencils, an employee at Cramblin Advertising 
Quintin Hicks as Quintin the Bartender
Chris Powell as Ned, a security guard for the building where Cramblin Advertising is located
Carolette Phillips as Rhonda Devereux
Jason Sudeikis as Carter Grant, a Chrysler executive
Mort Crim as Himself

Guest stars
Kevin Nash as "Big Hank" Cramblin, Cramblin-Duvet’s former CEO and Tim’s father who was committed to a mental hospital before the show’s events.
Chris Redd as Donut, a stand-up comedian whose routine relies heavily on Tim being in the audience.
Keegan-Michael Key 
Cecily Strong as Roz Chunks “The Mom Attorney,” a client of Cramblin-Duvet’s whose son is a compulsive masturbator.
Michael Che 
Marc Evan Jackson as Dr. Kozak
Larry Joe Campbell
Richard Karn as himself
Malcolm-Jamal Warner
Rick Mahorn as himself
Jim Harbaugh as himself
Steve Higgins as Eddie Champagne
Tim Meadows as Walt Worsch
George Wallace as Freddie "Motown" Brown
Wendy Raquel Robinson as Councilwoman Gwinett
Conner O'Malley as Trevor, Tim's brother
Trick Trick as Cash for Copper Carl
Danny Brown as Dr. Mayflower

Series overview

Episodes

Season 1 (2017)

Season 2 (2018)

Production

Development 
Robinson and Richardson, both raised in Michigan, performed improv comedy together first at Hamtramck's Planet Ant Theatre, and later at Chicago's Second City. They became close friends and conceptualized the idea of Detroiters. In an interview with the Metro Times, Robinson stated that they sought to depict Detroit as it really is and to avoid the overtly negative light in which the city is typically shown.

Lorne Michaels' Broadway Video produced the show, and Jason Sudeikis, Joe Kelly, and Zach Kanin were executive producers. Robinson and Richardson also wrote for the show.

Cast and filming 
Detroiters was shot on-location in Detroit; filming locations included Belle Isle, Hamtramck, the Detroit Institute of Arts, and the headquarters of Little Caesars. Many of the commercials shown throughout the series are based on actual spots that showed in the 1990s in the area.

The show hired over 200 people from Detroit, including cast members Lailani Ledesma, Christopher Powell, and Shawntay Dalon. The theme song was written by local artist and shoe entrepreneur Rick Williams.

Release 
Season 1 of Detroiters premiered on February 7, 2017 on Comedy Central. The show was renewed and season 2 premiered on June 21, 2018.

Cancellation
On December 11, 2018, it was announced that Comedy Central had chosen not to pick up the show for a third season. Along with the announcement, Richardson tweeted, "Maybe it will find a home elsewhere, who knows?" Comedian Seth Meyers wrote an op-ed for Vulture where he advocated for another network to pick up the show.

Broadcast
Internationally, the series premiered in Australia on The Comedy Channel on February 13, 2017.

Reception
Detroiters received positive reviews from television critics. On Rotten Tomatoes, the first season holds an approval rating of 88%, based on 16 reviews, with an average rating of 7/10. The site's critical consensus reads, "Proudly stupid yet surprisingly soulful, Detroiters showcases an impressive level of commitment from its charming, well-matched leads – and balances its goofy humor with an equal helping of heart." On Metacritic, the first season holds a score of 75 out of 100, based on 11 critics, indicating generally favorable reviews."

The second season received a 100% on Rotten Tomatoes.

References

External links
 
 

2010s American sitcoms
2017 American television series debuts
2018 American television series endings
Comedy Central original programming
English-language television shows
Television series by Broadway Video
Television shows set in Detroit